Malarum Kiliyum is a 1986 Indian Malayalam film directed by K. Madhu and produced by Jagan Appachan. The film stars Mammootty, Menaka, Ambika and Lalu Alex in the lead roles. The film has a musical score by Shyam.

Cast
Mammootty 
Menaka 
Ambika 
Lalu Alex as Renji 
M. G. Soman 
Sudha Chandran 
adoor bhasi
Jagathy Sreekumar
Sukumari
Minu Subash

Soundtrack
The music was composed by Shyam and the lyrics were written by K. Jayakumar.

References

External links
 

1986 films
1980s Malayalam-language films
Films scored by Shyam (composer)